Eladio Rosabal Cordero  (15 September 1894 — 26 April 1965) was a Costa Rican footballer who was one of the top midfielders in the history of the Primera División de Costa Rica. He was one of the founders of the Costa Rican football club, Herediano.

Club career
Rosabal began his football career with Club La Libertad, but left the club in 1921 to form Club Sport Herediano along with Joaquín Manuel "Toquita" Gutiérrez, Francisco "Paco" Fuentes and the brothers Gilberto "Beto" and Claudio "Cayito" Arguedas. Between 1921 and 1933, Rosabal Cordero played for Herediano and won eight Primera División de Costa Rica championships.

International career
He was a captain of the Costa Rica national football team.

Personal
Born in Heredia, Rosabal was the eldest of eight brothers and assumed responsibility for his family at age 21 following his father's death. He married Claudia Echeverría Flores, the daughter of writer and politician Aquileo J. Echeverría, and they had six children. He died from cancer in 1965.

Herediano's stadium is a memorial to him.

References

1894 births
1965 deaths
People from Heredia Province
Association football midfielders
Costa Rican footballers
Costa Rica international footballers
C.S. Herediano footballers
Costa Rican football managers
Costa Rica national football team managers
Deaths from cancer in Costa Rica